Til Debt Do Us Part (also stylized as 'Til Debt Do U$ Part) is a Canadian television series produced by Frantic Films for Slice in Canada, Zone Reality in the United Kingdom and CNBC in the United States, released in 2005.

Background 
It is hosted by Gail Vaz-Oxlade, who each week visits a couple who are in debt and having relationship troubles. The participants are given weekly challenges, some of which are to help bring the finances and debt under control, with the others meant to help the couple's relationship. At the end of one month, Vaz-Oxlade gives the couple a cheque for an amount up to $5,000, depending on how well they did during the challenges. A 52-Week Life Planner based on the television series was released in 2013 and offers day-by-day, step-by-step strategies and tips for successfully managing household finances.

Season 1 (2005-06)

Season 2 (2006-07)

Season 3 (2007)

Season 4 (2008)

Season 5 (2008)

Season 6 (2009)

Season 7 (2009)

Season 8 (2010-11)

Season 9 (2011)

See also
 Prince$$

References

External links
 

Slice (TV channel) original programming
Personal finance education
Canadian dating and relationship reality television series
Television series by Corus Entertainment
2000s Canadian reality television series
2010s Canadian reality television series
2005 Canadian television series debuts